is a Japanese racing driver who is set to compete for United Autosports in the European Le Mans Series. He is best known for winning the 2019 Euroformula Open Championship before competing in the FIA Formula 2 Championship from 2020 to 2022.

He is not related to former Formula One driver Takuma Sato.

Early career

Formula 4 
In 2015, Marino Sato competed in the 2015 Italian F4 Championship for Euronova Racing/Vincenzo Sospiri Racing. He finished on the podium once and came 10th in the final standings. Sato would remain with the team for the 2016 Italian F4 Championship. However, even when he won a race at Imola, he only finished 18th in the driver's championship.

FIA Formula 3 European Championship

2017 
Sato progressed to the 2017 FIA Formula 3 European Championship to drive for Motopark. He scored one point during the season and finished 19th in the standings.

2018 

Despite having been the second-lowest driver in the standings to compete at every event, he was retained for the 2018 season. His performance improved compared to 2017, and he finished 16th in the championship.

Euroformula Open 
He moved to the Euroformula Open Championship in 2019. He dominated the championship, winning it with nine victories and helped Motopark to win the team championship.

FIA Formula 2 Championship

2019 
In the Summer of 2019, Sato progressed to the FIA Formula 2 Championship, replacing Arjun Maini at Campos Racing from the round at Spa-Francorchamps onwards. However, after the fatal accident of Anthoine Hubert, the Japanese racer would not officially make his F2 debut until the Monza feature face, finishing twelfth overall. He improved to eleventh in the sprint, before having a point-less pair of races in Sochi. Sato would briefly challenge for points in the season finale in Yas Marina, albeit it was not enough to earn him a points finish. Despite this, he took part in the post-season test on the week after the final race, driving for Trident.

2020 
In 2020 he signed for Trident Racing to partner Roy Nissany in the FIA Formula 2 Championship. Sato only managed to score one point at Mugello, and eventually finished 22nd in the standings, four points and three positions behind Nissany.

2021 
Despite this, the Japanese driver was kept on by Trident for the 2021 season. In the second race of the first round he equalled his best ever F2 result, finishing eighth and scoring one point. However, this would end up being the only points finish for Sato, as he ended up 21st overall.

2022 

Sato remained in the series in 2022, this time joining Virtuosi Racing alongside Jack Doohan. A point-less opening weekend in Bahrain was followed up by his first points finish of the year, as Sato ended up eighth in the sprint race at Jeddah, after which he praised the team for the strong pace. After a pair of rounds that failed to yield any points, the Japanese driver broke his duck in Monaco, and managed to finish eighth in the subsequent feature race in Baku, having managed to steer clear of trouble in a race of attrition. The following rounds brought with them a heap of bad luck, with Sato experiencing multiple mechanical issues, as well as having a wheel falling off after a pit stop in Zandvoort, a race in which he had fought for points. Having failed to score points in the second half of the season, the Japanese driver finished 22nd in the drivers' standings.

Sato was replaced by Amaury Cordeel at Virtuosi for the 2023 season.

Formula One 
Sato drove in the end of season Young Driver Test in Abu Dhabi for Scuderia AlphaTauri, alongside fellow countryman Yuki Tsunoda (who would soon become an AlphaTauri race driver). He ended the session with the 13th fastest time (1:38.495), reflecting on that day as one that "made [him] visualise more what [his] dream is".

Sportscar career

2023: ELMS debut 
For the 2023 season, Sato transitioned into sportscar racing, drving for United Autosports in the LMP2 category alongside Philip Hanson and Oliver Jarvis.

Karting record

Karting career summary

Racing record

Racing career summary

Complete Italian F4 Championship results 
(key) (Races in bold indicate pole position) (Races in italics indicate fastest lap)

Complete FIA Formula 3 European Championship results 
(key) (Races in bold indicate pole position) (Races in italics indicate fastest lap)

‡ Half points awarded as less than 75% of race distance was completed.

Complete Macau Grand Prix results

Complete Euroformula Open Championship results 
(key) (Races in bold indicate pole position) (Races in italics indicate points for the fastest lap of top ten finishers)

Complete FIA Formula 2 Championship results 
(key) (Races in bold indicate pole position) (Races in italics indicate points for the fastest lap of top ten finishers)

† Driver did not finish the race, but was classified as they completed more than 90% of the race distance.
* Season still in progress.

Complete European Le Mans Series results
(key) (Races in bold indicate pole position; results in italics indicate fastest lap)

References

External links
   
 

1999 births
Living people
Sportspeople from Yokohama
Japanese racing drivers
FIA Formula 3 European Championship drivers
FIA Formula 2 Championship drivers
Euronova Racing drivers
Motopark Academy drivers
Campos Racing drivers
Trident Racing drivers
Virtuosi Racing drivers
Karting World Championship drivers
Italian F4 Championship drivers
Euroformula Open Championship drivers
European Le Mans Series drivers
United Autosports drivers